Lucker railway station served the village of Lucker, Northumberland, England, from 1847 to 1965 on the East Coast Main Line.

History 
The station opened on 29 March 1847 by the York, Newcastle and Berwick Railway. The station was situated north of the level crossing on the B1341 road. On the down side of the station, there were four sidings, two of which led to the coal depot. There was also a goods loading bank, but no goods depot. Lucker station was one to close during the Second World War, closing on 5 May 1941. It reopened on 7 October 1946 but the number of tickets sold was very low, (an average of 277 per year, which is around one a day) so closure hardly caused any inconvenience. The station closed for passengers in 1953 and completely on 7 June 1965.

References

External links 

Disused railway stations in Northumberland
Railway stations in Great Britain opened in 1847
Railway stations in Great Britain closed in 1941
Railway stations in Great Britain opened in 1946
Railway stations in Great Britain closed in 1953
1847 establishments in England
1953 disestablishments in England
Former North Eastern Railway (UK) stations